The Casualties are an American hardcore punk band from New York City, founded by vocalist Jorge Herrera, Hank (guitar), Colin Wolf (vocals), Mark Yoshitomi (bass) and Yureesh Hooker (drums) in 1990. In July 2017, it was announced on the band's Facebook page that original frontman Jorge Herrera had officially retired from touring. As of 2022, the band consists of members Jake Kolatis (guitarist), Marc Meggers (drums), Mike Casualty (bass), and David Rodriguez (vocals).

History

Early years (1990–1998) 
The Casualties were formed in 1990, with original members Jorge Herrera (vocals), Hank (guitar), Colin Wolf (vocals), Mark Yoshitomi (bass) and Yureesh Hooker (drums). The members aimed to return to what they viewed as the "golden era" of street punk, embodied by bands such as The Exploited and Charged GBH, which they believed had disappeared by 1985. During the early years, the lineup was fluid, with several changes.

In early 1991, Hank left the band and was replaced by Fred Backus on guitar to record Political Sin in March 1991 for the Benefit for Beer compilation. Soon more changes were in the works, with new guitarist Fred heading off to school. C Squat's Scott temporarily filled Fred's shoes until he returned a short time later. During this period, guitarist Hank filled in for a couple of shows, and Steve Distraught also played briefly with the group on second guitar. 

The Casualties stabilized long enough to record their first demo in the fall of 1991, and the “40 Oz Casualty” EP in the spring of 1992, and was building up a fan base in their hometown of New York City. At the end of 1992, Mark and Fred left the band and were replaced by Mike Roberts on bass and Jake Kolatis on the guitar, followed by the departure of Yureesh and Colin in 1994, to be replaced on drums by Shawn, while the band went down to a single vocalist. 1994 saw the recording of the four-song EP, Drinking Is Our Way of Life; however, it would not be released. The songs would later appear on the Casualties "The Early Years: 1990-1995" album in 1999. In 1995, the band's second release, the four-track A Fuckin' Way of Life EP was released on Eyeball Records. After recording A Fuckin' Way of Life, Shawn left the band, and Marc Eggers (nicknamed Meggers) of the Rivits became the regular drummer. The line-up of Jorge, Jake, Mike and Meggers continued until 1997.

In 1996 the Casualties became the first American band to appear at the "Holidays in the Sun" Festival in London. 1997 saw the release of the band's debut album For the Punx on Tribal War Records, and the band embarked on its first American tour with The Varukers. Mike (the bassist) left the band in 1998, to be replaced with Johnny Rosado, from The Krays. They released their second LP that year, Underground Army, and began a world tour. Jon left the band during the European leg of the tour, to be temporarily replaced by Dave Punk Core.

Later years (1998–2017) 

After the world tour, Dave would be replaced by Rick Lopez from the band Manix. The line-up was now solidified for the band. The end of the millennium, 1999, saw the band produce a compilation album, Early Years 1990–1995, which included tracks which appeared on earlier EPs, as well as never before released songs, such as the four songs they had recorded on the never released EP Drinking Is Our Way of Life back in 1994.

The 2000s have seen the band to continue to tour and produce albums (an album list can be seen below). They have toured with several other bands, such as The Exploited, GBH, Cockney Rejects, Slaughter & the Dogs, and the English Dogs. In December 2009, The Casualties toured alongside Hatebreed, The Acacia Strain, Crowbar, and Thy Will Be Done as part of the Stillborn Fest. In the summer of 2012, The Casualties co-headlined the Tonight We Unite tour along with Nekromantix, where they played For the Punx in its entirety, the first time they had played the album through since its release in 1997. Later that year, The Casualties released their new album titled Resistance through Season of Mist. In 2013, The Casualties played at the largest punk rock festival in the world, the Rebellion Festival in Blackpool, England, where they shared the stage with The Exploited, Special Duties, Chron Gen and Anti-Establishment, and others.

Chaos Sound, departure of Herrera, and new member (2016–present) 
On January 22, 2016, the band released their tenth studio album titled Chaos Sound. The album was recorded in Orange County, California at Buzzbomb Studio, produced by Paul Miner and released by Season of Mist. It is the last album to feature original vocalist Jorge Herrera.

In the second quarter of 2017, Herrera retired from touring and recording with the band after being accused of multiple incidents of rape and sexual assault of a 16 year old minor. While no longer associating with The Casualties, there have been no incidents to indicate that there is any bad blood between Herrera and the remaining or current members of The Casualties. Frontman of The Krum Bums, David Rodriguez officially replaced Herrera, changing the band's line-up for the first time in 19 years. Guitarist Jake Kolatis and drummer Meggers are the two remaining long term members of the band, along with the band's bassist since 1999, Rick Lopez.

Members

Current 
Jake Kolatis – guitar (1993–present)
Marc "Meggers" Eggers – drums (1995–present)
David Rodriguez – lead vocals (2017–present)
Mike Casualty - bass (2022-present)

Former 
Rick Lopez – bass (1998–2022)
Jorge Herrera – lead vocals (1990–2017)
Colin Wolf – vocals (1990–1994)
Hank Fischer – guitar (1990–1991)
Fred Backus – guitar (1991–1993)
Mark Yoshitomi – bass (1990–1993)guest appearance in 2016
Mike Roberts – bass (1993–1997)
Johnny Rosado – bass (1997–1998)
Yureesh Hooker – drums (1990–1994)
Shawn – drums (1994–1995)

Timeline

Discography

Studio albums 
 1997: For the Punx
 1998: Underground Army
 2000: Stay Out of Order
 2001: Die Hards
 2004: On the Front Line
 2005: En la Línea del Frente
 2006: Under Attack
 2009: We Are All We Have
 2012: Resistance
 2016: Chaos Sound
 2018: Written in Blood

Compilation albums 
2001: The Early Years: 1990–1995
2010: For the Casualties Army

Live albums 
1999: Live at the Fireside Bowl
2003: More at the Fireside Bowl
2007: Made in NYC

Extended plays 
1992: 40 Oz. Casualty
1995: A Fuckin' Way of Life
2000: Who's in Control?

Appearances on various artists compilations 
1991: Benefit for Beer – "Political Sin"
1994 Pogo Attack LP – "25 Years To Late" – "For The Punx"
1998: Punx Unite – "Punx Unite"
2000: Punx Unite 2 – "Way of Life"
2001 Warped Tour 2001 – "Fight For Your Life"
2003 The Sound of Rebellion – "Killing Machine" – "Politicians" – "No Rules"
2003: Warped Tour 2003 – "Made in N.Y.C."
2004: AMP Magazine Presents: Street Punk, Vol. 2 – "Sounds From the Streets"
2004: Warped Tour 2004 – "Tomorrow Belongs To Us"
2005: Punx Unite-Leaders of Today – "Rebel"
2006: Warped Tour 2006 – "Under Attack"
2007: Warped Tour 2007 – "In It For Life"
2007: Take Action Tour 2007 – "VIP"
2010: Warped Tour 2010 – "We Are All We Have"

Music videos 
1998: Live at NewCastle Riverside
1998: Underground Army World Tour
2000: Nightmare
2001: Get Off My Back
2004: Tomorrow Belongs to Us
2006: Can't Stop Us
2006: On City Streets
2009: War Is Business
2009: We Are All We Have
2013: My Blood. My Life. Always Forward.
2015: Corazones Intoxicados
2016: Chaos Sound
2016: Running Through the Night
2017: Brothers and Sisters
2018: 1312
2019: Ya Basta
2019: Borders
2019: Fucking Hate You

References

External links 

The Casualties (@thecasualties_official) • Instagram photos and videos
Burning Stars Interview with Jake – 2006

Hardcore punk groups from New York (state)
Street punk groups
Season of Mist artists
SideOneDummy Records artists
Cleopatra Records artists